The 2018 New York Yankees season was the 116th season for the New York Yankees. This was the team's first season without manager Joe Girardi since 2007, and first season with manager Aaron Boone. The Yankees defeated the Oakland Athletics in the Wild Card Game before losing to the Boston Red Sox in four games in the Division Series.

Offseason
After the 2017 season, the Yankees decided not to retain Joe Girardi as their manager. The Yankees hired former player Aaron Boone to succeed him on December 4, 2017.

Transactions
On December 9, 2017, the Yankees traded All-star second baseman Starlin Castro and two minor league prospects to the Miami Marlins for reigning NL MVP Giancarlo Stanton. The deal was made official December 11. After the deal was announced, General Manager Brian Cashman received a contract extension for 5 years, reportedly worth $25 million.

On December 12, 2017, the first day of the MLB Winter Meetings, the Yankees traded Chase Headley and Bryan Mitchell to the San Diego Padres for Jabari Blash. This will be Headley's second stint with the Padres.

On February 20, 2018, the Yankees acquired infielder Brandon Drury from the Arizona Diamondbacks in a three team trade along with the Tampa Bay Rays. As part of the deal, the Yankees sent prospect Nick Solak to the Rays and Arizona received prospect Taylor Widener along with Steven Souza Jr. from Tampa Bay. To make room for Drury on the 40-man roster, the Yankees traded Blash to the Los Angeles Angels for a PTBNL or cash considerations.

On March 12, 2018, the Yankees signed second baseman Neil Walker to a 1-year, $4 million contract.

Spring training

The Yankees finished their spring training in 4th place in the Grapefruit league with an 18–13 record, a .581 winning percentage.

Regular season

March
The Yankees began the regular season on March 29, 2018, with a 6–1 win over the Toronto Blue Jays at Rogers Centre in Toronto, Canada. They ended up going 2–1 in the first 3 games of the season.

April
On April 20, following their loss to the Toronto Blue Jays, they had a record of 9–9, and were in third place in the American League East, seven games behind the first place Boston Red Sox. They would follow this by winning 17 out of their next 18 games which would, at 26–10, give them the best record in all of MLB. They finished the month going 16–9.

Yankees–Red Sox brawl

On April 11, 2018, the Yankee-Red Sox rivalry heated up at Fenway Park when the Yankees and the Boston Red Sox game broke out into a brawl.

With the Yankees leading 10–6 in the 7th inning, Yankees first basemen Tyler Austin got hit by a pitch thrown by reliever Joe Kelly. Austin was drilled with a 98 MPH fastball, possibly in retaliation after Austin slid foot-first into Red Sox shortstop Brock Holt in the 3rd inning, striking his leg and breaking up a double play. Holt questioned the slide and Austin briefly got in his face before the second base umpire David Rackley intervened. The benches emptied but it turned into a harmless stare down. The play was under review and was deemed a "bona fide slide" and did not break up the double play.

Austin charged the mound and both teams benches and bullpens cleared with both Aaron Judge and Giancarlo Stanton helping to protect their teammates, as well as conducting damage control with Red Sox players.

When the altercation settled down, Yankees third base coach Phil Nevin, who was "jawing" towards the Red Sox dugout, and Austin were ejected, along with Kelly. Also Yankees reliever Tommy Kahnle was tossed because he was "incensed" after he was pushed by an umpire in the scuffle.

Discipline actions were set the next day: Kelly was fined and suspended for 6 games; Austin was fined and suspended for 5 games; while Nevin and Red Sox manager Alex Cora were issued undisclosed fines. Players on the Disabled List were also fined for entering the field during the skirmish: Yankees pitcher C.C. Sabathia and Red Sox infielders Xander Bogarts, Marco Hernández, and Dustin Pedroia.

May

The Yankees started the month winning against the Houston Astros 4–0 on a go-ahead 3-run home run by Gary Sanchez. They took over first place from the Boston Red Sox on May 9 by winning against them, 9–6. They finished the month going 17–7, putting them with a season record of 35-17. Even so, this set them back to second place in the division, 1 1/2 games behind the Red Sox (39–18).

June

The Yankees started the month with a 4–1 victory over the Baltimore Orioles. They finished the series with baseball's best record (37–17), even though they were still one game behind the Boston Red Sox (41–19) for the division lead.
This happened several more times throughout the month. On June 21, the Yankees made franchise history with a win over the Seattle Mariners, making it their 50th win on the season in just their 72nd game. In previous seasons, they reached that feat eight times (7 out of 8 they made it to the World Series). The Yankees finished the month losing 11–0 against the Red Sox. They went 18–9 for the month, putting their record at 53–27, one game back of the Red Sox (56–28).

July
The Yankees started the month by blowing out the Red Sox 11–1, putting them back into a tie for first place in the division. They hit 6 home runs in the game (Aaron Judge started it off with a solo shot, Gleyber Torres had a three-run blast, Aaron Hicks hit 3, and Kyle Higashioka had one for his first MLB hit), setting the team record for the most home runs hit by a team before the All-Star break with 137. The Yankees sent four players to the All-Star Game in Washington, D.C. Judge and Luis Severino played, while Torres and Aroldis Chapman sat out due to injuries. Before the Trade Deadline, the team acquired J. A. Happ from the Blue Jays, Zach Britton from the Orioles, Lance Lynn from the Twins, and Luke Voit from the Cardinals. The Yankees finished the month winning against the Orioles 6–3, going 15–10 for the month and 68–37 overall. This, however, pushed them 5 games back of the Red Sox, who continue to own the best record in baseball at 75–35.

August
The Yankees started the month losing to the Orioles 7–5 in the series finale. They traveled to Fenway Park to face the Boston Red Sox and tried to get closer to first place in the division. However they lost in a four-game sweep to their division rivals. The Yankees snapped their five-game losing streak (their longest of the season) with a 7–0 shoutout win over the Chicago White Sox, sweeping them in three games. At home, they then took three out of four from the Texas Rangers and lost the one-game matchup against the New York Mets 8–5, that was postponed previously due to weather inclements. The Yankees played the Baltimore Orioles in a four-game series spread out over three days, which saw the Yankees sweep the series and coming back to 6 games behind the Red Sox. The month ended with the Yankees winning against the Detroit Tigers 7–5, putting them (85-50) 8 games back of the Red Sox (93–42).

September
The Yankees started the month winning 2–1 against the Detroit Tigers. Masahiro Tanaka completed back-to-back outings of 7 or more innings for the first time since September 2, 2017. The Boston Red Sox clinched the AL East title by winning against the Yankees 11–6 on September 20. However, the Yankees clinched an AL Wild Card spot two days later by winning against the Baltimore Orioles 3–2 in 11 innings. This will be the Yankees third postseason appearance in five years, all of which will begin with the Wild Card Game. On September 28, with a win over the Boston Red Sox, the Yankees clinched home field advantage and will face the Oakland Athletics in the AL Wild Card Game. The next day, with a 4th inning two-run home run by Gleyber Torres, the Yankees broke single season home run record set by the 1997 Seattle Mariners with 265 home runs (a game later 267). Also, the Yankees became the first team in MLB history to have at least 20 home runs from every spot in the batting order. As well as sharing history with the Red Sox. For the first season in MLB history both teams reached 100 wins.

October
The Yankees began the postseason by defeating the Athletics in the 2018 American League Wild Card Game 7-2. They moved on to face the Boston Red Sox in the ALDS. This was the first time since the 2004 American League Championship Series that the two teams faced each other in the postseason. They fell short in 4 games, as Boston defeated the Yankees 3 games to 1. This marks the first time in franchise history that they would lose in the postseason as a Wild Card team in back-to-back seasons.

Season standings

American League East

American League Wild Card

Record against opponents

Detailed records

Roster

Game log

|-style=background:#bfb
| 1 || March 29 || @ Blue Jays || 6–1 || Severino (1–0) || Happ (0–1) ||—|| Rogers Centre || 48,115 || 1–0  
|-style=background:#bfb
| 2 || March 30 || @ Blue Jays ||4–2 || Tanaka (1–0) || Sanchez (0–1) || Chapman (1) || Rogers Centre || 33,716 || 2–0
|-style=background:#fbb
|3 ||March 31||@ Blue Jays || 3–5 || Tepera (1–0) || Betances (0–1) || Osuna (1) || Rogers Centre || 37,692 || 2–1
|-

|-style=background:#fbb
|4 ||April 1||@ Blue Jays || 4–7 || Clippard (1–0) || Robertson (0–1) || Oh (1) || Rogers Centre || 29,091 || 2–2
|-style=background:#bbb
| — || April 2 || Rays || colspan=7 | Postponed (inclement weather: snow). Makeup date: April 3
|-style=background:#bfb
|5 ||April 3|| Rays || 11–4 || Kahnle (1–0) || Pruitt (1–1) || — || Yankee Stadium || 46,776 || 3–2
|-style=background:#bfb
|6 ||April 4|| Rays || 7–2 || Severino (2–0) || Snell (0–1) || — || Yankee Stadium || 40,028 || 4–2
|-style=background:#fbb
|7 ||April 5|| Orioles || 2—5 || Cashner (1–1) || Tanaka (1–1) || Brach (1) || Yankee Stadium || 33,653 || 4–3
|-style=background:#fbb
|8 ||April 6|| Orioles || 3–7|| Araujo (1–0) ||Holder (0–1)|| — || Yankee Stadium || 34,244 || 4–4
|-style=background:#bfb
|9 ||April 7|| Orioles ||8–3 ||Gray (1–0)||Tillman (0–2)||—|| Yankee Stadium || 34,388 || 5–4
|-style=background:#fbb
|10 ||April 8|| Orioles || 7–8 (12) || Bleier (2–0) || Warren (0–1) || Brach (2) || Yankee Stadium || 37,096 || 5–5
|-style=background:#fbb
|11 ||April 10||@ Red Sox || 1–14 || Sale (1–0) || Severino (2–1)|| – || Fenway Park || 32,357 || 5–6
|-style=background:#bfb
|12 ||April 11||@ Red Sox || 10–7 || Tanaka (2–1) || Price (1–1)|| — ||Fenway Park || 32,400 || 6–6
|-style=background:#fbb
|13 ||April 12||@ Red Sox || 3–6 ||Porcello (3–0) || Gray (1–1)|| Kimbrel (4) || Fenway Park || 36,341 || 6–7
|-style=background:#bfb
|14 ||April 13||@ Tigers || 8–6 || Montgomery (1–0) || Fiers (1–1) || Chapman (2) || Comerica Park || 21,363 || 7–7
|-style=background:#bbb
| — || April 14 ||@ Tigers  || colspan=7 | Postponed (inclement weather). Makeup date: June 4, double header
|-style=background:#bbb
| — || April 15 ||@ Tigers  || colspan=7 | Postponed (inclement weather). Makeup date: June 4, double header
|-style=background:#bfb
|15 ||April 16|| Marlins || 12–1 || Severino (3–1) || Smith (0–2) || — || Yankee Stadium || 32,525 || 8–7
|-style=background:#fbb
|16 ||April 17|| Marlins || 1–9 || Gracía (1–0) || Tanaka (2–2) || — || Yankee Stadium || 34,005 || 8–8
|-style=background:#bfb
|17 ||April 19|| Blue Jays || 4–3 || Green (1–0) || Sanchez (1–2) || Chapman (3) || Yankee Stadium || 36,665 || 9–8
|-style=background:#fbb
|18 ||April 20|| Blue Jays || 5–8 || Estrada (2–1) || Germán (0–1) || Osuna (6) || Yankee Stadium || 39,197 || 9–9
|-style=background:#bfb
|19 ||April 21|| Blue Jays || 9–1 || Montgomery (2–0) ||Stroman (0–2) || — || Yankee Stadium || 40,986 || 10–9
|-style=background:#bfb
|20||April 22|| Blue Jays || 5–1 || Severino (4–1) || García (2–1) || — || Yankee Stadium || 43,628 || 11–9
|-style=background:#bfb
|21 ||April 23|| Twins || 14–1 ||  Tanaka (3–2) || Odorizzi (1–2) || — || Yankee Stadium || 39,249 || 12–9
|-style=background:#bfb
|22 ||April 24|| Twins || 8–3 || Sabathia (1–0) || Berríos (2–2) || — || Yankee Stadium || 39,025 || 13–9
|-style=background:#bfb
|23||April 25|| Twins || 7–4 ||  Green (2–0) || Lynn (0–2) || Chapman (4) || Yankee Stadium || 39,243 || 14–9
|-style=background:#bfb
|24 ||April 26|| Twins || 4–3 || Betances (1-1) || Rodney (1-2) || — || Yankee Stadium || 40,758 || 15–9
|-style=background:#bfb
|25 ||April 27||@ Angels || 4–3 || Robertson (1–1) || Parker (0–1) || Chapman (5) || Angel Stadium || 40,416 || 16–9
|-style=background:#bfb
|26 ||April 28||@ Angels || 11–1 || Tanaka (4–2) || Richards (3–1) || — || Angel Stadium || 44,649 || 17–9
|-style=background:#bfb
|27 ||April 29||@ Angels || 2–1 || Sabathia (2–0) || Skaggs (3–2) || Chapman (6) || Angel Stadium || 44,593 || 18–9
|-style=background:#fbb
|28 ||April 30||@ Astros || 1–2 ||  Morton (4–0) || Gray (1–2) || Giles (3) || Minute Maid Park || 30,061 || 18–10
|-

|-style=background:#bfb
|29 ||May 1||@ Astros || 4–0 || Robertson (2–1) || Giles (0–1) || — || Minute Maid Park || 34,386 || 19–10
|-style=background:#bfb
|30 ||May 2||@ Astros || 4–0 || Severino (5–1) || Keuchel (1–5)|| — || Minute Maid Park || 31,617 || 20–10
|-style=background:#bfb
|31 ||May 3||@ Astros || 6–5 || Shreve (1–0) ||Harris (1–2) || Chapman (7) || Minute Maid Park|| 34,838 || 21–10
|-style=background:#bfb
|32 ||May 4|| Indians || 7–6 || Chapman (1–0) || Ogando (0–1) ||—|| Yankee Stadium || 46,869 || 22–10
|-style=background:#bfb 
|33 ||May 5|| Indians || 5–2 || Gray (2–2)|| Bauer (2–3)|| Robertson (1) || Yankee Stadium || 43,075 || 23–10
|-style=background:#bfb
|34 ||May 6|| Indians || 7–4 || Shreve (2–0) || Allen (2–1) ||—|| Yankee Stadium || 40,107 || 24–10
|-style=background:#bfb
|35 ||May 8|| Red Sox || 3–2 || Robertson (3–1) || Hembree (2–1) || Chapman (8) || Yankee Stadium || 45,773 || 25–10
|-style=background:#bfb
|36 ||May 9|| Red Sox || 9–6 || Holder (1–1) || Barnes (0–1) || Chapman (9) || Yankee Stadium || 47,008 || 26–10
|-style=background:#fbb
|37 ||May 10|| Red Sox || 4–5 || Kelly (2–0) || Betances (1–2)|| Kimbrel (10) || Yankee Stadium || 46,899 || 26–11
|-style=background:#fbb
|38 ||May 11|| Athletics || 5–10 || Graveman (1–5) || Gray (2–3) || Treinen (6) || Yankee Stadium || 43,093 || 26–12
|-style=background:#bfb
|39 ||May 12|| Athletics || 7–6 (11) || Cole (2–1) || Hatcher (3–1) || — || Yankee Stadium || 41,859 || 27–12
|-style=background:#bfb
|40 ||May 13|| Athletics || 6–2 || Severino (6–1) || Anderson (0–2) || — || Yankee Stadium || 40,538 || 28–12
|-style=background:#fbb
|41  ||May 15||@ Nationals || 3–5 || Suero (1–0) || Green (4–1) || Doolittle (18) || Nationals Park || 41,567 || 28–13
|-style=background:#fbb
|42 ||May 18||@ Royals|| 2-5  || Junis (5–3) || Sabathia (2–1) || Herrera (9) || Kauffman Stadium || 26,433 || 28–14
|-style=background:#bfb
|43 ||May 19||@ Royals || 8–3 || Severino (7–1) || Duffy (1–6)||—|| Kauffman Stadium || 33,684 || 29–14
|-style=background:#bfb
|44 ||May 20||@ Royals || 10–1 || Gray (3–3) || Skoglund (1–4) ||—|| Kauffman Stadium || 24,121 || 30–14
|-style=background:#bfb
|45 ||May 21||@ Rangers || 10–5 || Tanaka (5–2) ||  Colón (2–2) ||—|| Globe Life Park || 29,553 || 31–14
|-style=background:#fbb
|46 ||May 22||@ Rangers || 4–6 || Hamels (3–4) || Germán (0–2) || Kela (9) || Globe Life Park || 30,325 || 31–15
|-style=background:#fbb
|47 ||May 23||@ Rangers || 10–12 || Claudio (2–2) || Robertson (3–2) || Kela (10) || Globe Life Park || 31,304 || 31–16
|-style=background:#bfb
|48 ||May 25|| Angels || 2–1 || Green (3–0) || Johnson (2–2) || Chapman (10) || Yankee Stadium || 46,056 || 32–16
|-style=background:#fbb
|49 ||May 26|| Angels || 4–11 || Barria (4–1) || Gray (3–4) ||—|| Yankee Stadium || 44,565 || 32–17
|-style=background:#bfb
|50 ||May 27|| Angels || 3–1 || Tanaka (6–2) || Richards (4–4) || Chapman (11) || Yankee Stadium || 46,109 || 33–17
|-style=background:#fbb
|51 ||May 28|| Astros || 1–5 ||Verlander (7–2) || Germán (0–3)||—|| Yankee Stadium || 46,583 || 33–18
|-style=background:#bfb
|52 ||May 29|| Astros || 6–5 (10) || Chapman (2–0)|| Peacock (1–3)||—|| Yankee Stadium || 45,458 || 34–18
|-style=background:#bfb
|53 ||May 30|| Astros || 5–3 || Severino (8–1) || Keuchel (3–7) || Chapman (12) || Yankee Stadium || 45,229 || 35–18
|-style=background:#bbb
| — ||May 31||@ Orioles || colspan=7|Postponed (inclement weather). Makeup date: July 9, double header
|-

|-style=background:#bfb
|54 ||June 1||@ Orioles || 4–1 || Gray (4–4) || Cashner (2–7) || Chapman (13) || Oriole Park at Camden Yards || 26,500 || 36–18
|-style=background:#bfb
|55 ||June 2||@ Orioles || 8–5 || Tanaka (7–2) || Gausman (3–5) || — || Oriole Park at Camden Yards || 32,823 || 37–18
|-style=background:#bbb
| — ||June 3||@ Orioles || colspan=7|Postponed (inclement weather). Makeup date: August 25, double header
|-style=background:#bfb
|56 ||June 4||@ Tigers || 7–4 || Severino (9–1) || VerHagen (0–2) || Chapman (14) || Comerica Park || 28,016 || 38–18
|-style=background:#fbb
|57||June 4||@ Tigers || 2–4 || Fiers (5–3) || Germán (0–4) || Greene (15) || Comerica Park || 24,165 || 38–19
|-style=background:#bfb
|58 ||June 5||@ Blue Jays || 7–2 || Sabathia (3–1) || Oh (1–2) ||—|| Rogers Centre || 29,308 || 39–19
|-style=background:#bfb
|59 ||June 6||@ Blue Jays || 3–0 (13) || Robertson (4–2) || Biagini (0–5) || Chapman (15) || Rogers Centre || 27,838 || 40–19
|-style=background:#bfb
|60 ||June 8||@ Mets || 4–1 ||Green (4–0) || deGrom (4–1) || Chapman (16) || Citi Field || 42,961 || 41–19
|-style=background:#bfb
|61 ||June 9||@ Mets || 4–3 ||Robertson (5–2) || Swarzak (0–1) || Chapman (17) || Citi Field || 43,603 || 42–19
|-style=background:#fbb
|62 ||June 10||@ Mets || 0–2 || Lugo (2–1) || Severino (9–2) || Swarzak (1) || Citi Field || 36,171 || 42–20
|-style=background:#bfb
|63 ||June 12|| Nationals || 3–0 || Sabathia (4–1) || Roark (3–7) || Chapman (18) || Yankee Stadium || 44,220 || 43–20
|-style=background:#fbb
|64 ||June 13|| Nationals || 4–5 || Miller (4–0) || Shreve (2–1) || Doolittle (17) || Yankee Stadium || 45,030 || 43–21
|-style=background:#bfb 
|65||June 14|| Rays || 4–3 || Germán (1–4) || Snell (8–4) || Chapman (19) || Yankee Stadium || 45,066 || 44–21
|-style=background:#bfb
|66 ||June 15|| Rays || 5–0 || Loáisiga (1–0) || Eovaldi (1–2) || — || Yankee Stadium || 45,112 || 45–21
|-style=background:#bfb
|67||June 16|| Rays || 4–1 || Severino (10–2) || Yarbrough (5–3) || Chapman (20) || Yankee Stadium || 46,249  || 46–21
|-style=background:#fbb
|68||June 17|| Rays || 1–3 || Roe (1–1) || Sabathia (4–2)|| Romo (3) || Yankee Stadium || 46,400 || 46–22
|-style=background:#bfb
|69 ||June 18||@ Nationals || 4–2 || Gray (5–4) || Fedde (0–2) || Chapman (21) || Nationals Park || 42,723 || 47–22 
|-style=background:#bfb
|70 ||June 19|| Mariners || 7–2 || Germán (2–4) || Gonzales (7–4) || — || Yankee Stadium || 45,122 || 48–22
|-style=background:#bfb
|71 ||June 20|| Mariners || 7–5 || Chapman (3–0) || Cook (1–1) ||—|| Yankee Stadium || 46,047 || 49–22
|-style=background:#bfb
|72 ||June 21|| Mariners || 4–3 || Severino (11–2) || Paxton (6–2) || Chapman (22) || Yankee Stadium || 46,658 || 50–22
|-style=background:#fbb
|73||June 22||@ Rays || 1–2 || Yarbrough (6–3) ||  Sabathia (4–3) || Romo (5) || Tropicana Field || 27,252 || 50–23
|-style=background:#fbb
|74||June 23||@ Rays || 0–4 || Font (1–3) || Gray (5–5) ||—|| Tropicana Field || 29,831 || 50–24
|-style=background:#fbb
|75 ||June 24||@ Rays || 6–7 (12)|| Yarbrough (7–3) || Shreve (2–2) ||—|| Tropicana Field || 23,667 || 50–25 
|-style=background:#bfb
|76||June 25||@ Phillies || 4–2 ||  Loáisiga (2–0) || Velasquez (5–8) || Chapman (23)|| Citizens Bank Park || 44,136 || 51–25
|-style=background:#bfb
|77||June 26||@ Phillies || 6–0 || Severino (12–2) || Arrieta (5–6)  ||—|| Citizens Bank Park || 43,568 || 52–25
|-style=background:#fbb
|78||June 27||@ Phillies || 0–3 || Eflin (6–2) || Cessa (0–1) || Domínguez (5) || Citizens Bank Park || 42,028 || 52–26
|-style=background:#bfb
|79||June 29|| Red Sox || 8–1 || Sabathia (5–3) || Rodriguez (9–3) ||—|| Yankee Stadium || 47,120 || 53–26
|-style=background:#fbb
|80||June 30|| Red Sox || 0–11 || Sale (8–4)|| Gray (5–6)||—|| Yankee Stadium || 47,125 || 53–27
|-

|-style=background:#bfb
|81||July 1|| Red Sox || 11–1 || Severino (13–2) || Price (9–6) ||—|| Yankee Stadium || 46,795 || 54–27
|-style=background:#fbb
|82||July 2|| Braves || 3–5 (11) || Biddle (2–0) || Robertson (5–3) || Minter (4) || Yankee Stadium || 43,792 || 54–28
|-style=background:#bfb
|83||July 3|| Braves || 8–5 || Cole (3–1) || Newcomb (8–3)|| Chapman (24) || Yankee Stadium || 45,448 || 55–28
|-style=background:#bfb
|84||July 4|| Braves || 6–2 || Sabathia (6–3) || Teherán (6–6) ||—|| Yankee Stadium || 46,658 || 56–28
|-style=background:#fbb
|85||July 6||@ Blue Jays || 2–6 || Biagini (1–5) || Gray (5–7) ||—|| Rogers Centre || 37,254 || 56–29
|-style=background:#bfb
|86||July 7||@ Blue Jays || 8–5 || Severino (14–2) || Happ (10–5) ||—|| Rogers Centre || 44,352 || 57–29 
|-style=background:#bfb
|87||July 8||@ Blue Jays || 2–1 (10) || Green (5–1) || Clippard (4–3) || Robertson (2) || Rogers Centre || 39,866 || 58–29 
|-style=background:#fbb
|88||July 9||@ Orioles || 4–5 || Wright (2–0) || Sabathia (6–4) || Britton (2) || Orioles Park at Camden Yards || — || 58–30
|-style=background:#bfb
|89||July 9||@ Orioles || 10–2 || Cessa (1–1) || Ramirez (0–3)|| Gallegos (1) || Orioles Park at Camden Yards || 26,340 || 59–30
|-style=background:#fbb
|90||July 10||@ Orioles || 5–6 || Britton (1–0) || Betances (1–3) ||—|| Orioles Park at Camden Yards || 18,418 || 59–31 
|-style=background:#bfb
|91||July 11||@ Orioles || 9–0 || Gray (6–7) || Bundy (6–9) ||—|| Orioles Park at Camden Yards || 17,808 || 60–31
|-style=background:#bfb
|92||July 12||@ Indians || 7–4 || Robertson (6–3) || Kluber (12–5) || Chapman (25) || Progressive Field || 31,267 || 61–31
|-style=background:#fbb
|93||July 13||@ Indians || 5–6 || Bieber (5–1) || Germán (2–5) || Allen (19) || Progressive Field || 35,078 || 61–32 
|-style=background:#bfb
|94||July 14||@ Indians || 5–4 || Robertson (7–3) || Clevinger (7–5) || Chapman (26) || Progressive Field || 35,353 || 62–32
|-style=background:#fbb
|95||July 15||@ Indians || 2–5 || Carrasco (11–5) || Green (5–2) || Allen (20) || Progressive Field || 32,644 || 62–33
|-style=background:#bff
|colspan="10"|89th All-Star Game in Washington, D.C.
|-style=background:#fbb
|96||July 20|| Mets || 5–7 ||Syndergaard (6–1) || Germán (2–6) || Gsellman (5) || Yankee Stadium || 47,175 || 62–34
|-style=background:#bfb
|97||July 21|| Mets || 7–6 || Gray (7–7) || Matz (4–8) || Shreve (1) || Yankee Stadium || 47,102 || 63–34
|-style=background:#bbb
| — ||July 22|| Mets || colspan=7 | Postponed (inclement weather). Makeup date: August 13|-style=background:#fbb
|98||July 23||@ Rays || 6–7 || Andriese (3–4) || Severino (14–3) ||Alvarado (4) || Tropicana Field || 14,670 || 63–35
|-style=background:#bfb
|99||July 24||@ Rays || 4–0 || Tanaka (8–2) || Chirinos (0–2) ||—|| Tropicana Field || 19,579 || 64–35
|-style=background:#fbb
|100||July 25||@ Rays || 2–3 || Castillo (2–1) || Cessa (1–2) || Romo (12) || Tropicana Field || 27,372 || 64–36
|-style=background:#bfb
|101||July 26|| Royals || 7–2 || Gray (8–7) || Junis (5–11) ||—|| Yankee Stadium || 46,965 || 65–36 
|-style=background:#bbb
| — ||July 27|| Royals || colspan="7" | Postponed (inclement weather). Makeup date: July 28'', double header
|-style=background:#fbb
|102||July 28|| Royals || 5–10 || Keller (4–4)|| Severino (14–4)||—|| Yankee Stadium || 46,571 || 65–37
|-style=background:#bfb
|103||July 28|| Royals || 5–4 || Betances (2–3) || Flynn (2–2) || Chapman (27) || Yankee Stadium || 45,043 || 66–37
|-style=background:#bfb
|104||July 29|| Royals || 6–3 || Happ (11–6) || Smith (1–2) || Chapman (28) || Yankee Stadium || 46,192 || 67–37
|-style=background:#bfb
|105||July 31|| Orioles || 6–3 || Tanaka (9–2) || Ramírez (1–4) || Chapman (29) || Yankee Stadium || 46,473 || 68–37
|-

|-style=background:#fbb
|106||August 1|| Orioles || 5–7 || Cobb (3–14) || Gray (8–8) ||—|| Yankee Stadium || 47,206 || 68–38
|-style=background:#fbb
|107||August 2||@ Red Sox || 7–15 || Johnson (2–3) || Holder (1–2) ||—|| Fenway Park || 37,317 || 68–39
|-style=background:#fbb
|108||August 3||@ Red Sox || 1–4 || Porcello (14–4) || Severino (14–5) ||—|| Fenway Park || 37,231 || 68–40
|-style=background:#fbb
|109||August 4||@ Red Sox || 1–4 || Eovaldi (5–4) || Adams (0–1) ||—|| Fenway Park || 36,699 || 68–41
|-style=background:#fbb
|110||August 5||@ Red Sox || 4–5  (10)  || Barnes (4–3) || Holder (1–3) ||—|| Fenway Park || 37,830 || 68–42
|-style=background:#bfb
|111||August 6||@ White Sox || 7–0 || Lynn (8–8) || Covey (4–8) ||—|| Guaranteed Rate Field || 22,084 || 69–42
|-style=background:#bfb
|112||August 7||@ White Sox || 4–3  (13)  || Gray (9–8) || Avilán (2–1) ||—|| Guaranteed Rate Field || 19,643 || 70–42
|-style=background:#bfb
|113||August 8||@ White Sox || 7–3 || Severino (15–5) || Giolito (7–9) ||—|| Guaranteed Rate Field || 27,038 || 71–42
|-style=background:#bfb
|114||August 9|| Rangers || 7–3 || Happ (12–6) || Jurado (2–2) ||—|| Yankee Stadium || 43,455 || 72–42
|-style=background:#fbb
|115||August 10|| Rangers || 7–12 || Minor (9–6) || Tanaka (9–3) ||—|| Yankee Stadium || 45,198 || 72–43
|-style=background:#bfb
|116||August 11|| Rangers || 5–3 || Betances (3–3) || Martin (1–3) || Chapman (30) || Yankee Stadium || 45,933 || 73–43
|-style=background:#bfb
|117||August 12|| Rangers || 7–2 || Sabathia (7–4) || Pérez (2–5) ||—|| Yankee Stadium || 41,304 || 74–43
|-style=background:#fbb
|118||August 13|| Mets || 5–8 || deGrom (7–7) || Severino (15–6) ||Gsellman (7) || Yankee Stadium || 47,233 || 74–44
|-style=background:#bfb
|119||August 14|| Rays || 4–1 || Happ (13–6) || Wood (0–1) || Chapman (31) || Yankee Stadium || 40,393 || 75–44
|-style=background:#fbb
|120||August 15|| Rays || 1–6 || Yarbrough (11–5) || Cessa (1–3) ||—|| Yankee Stadium || 42,716 || 75–45
|-style=background:#fbb
|121||August 16|| Rays || 1–3 || Snell (14–5) || Tanaka (9–4) || Kolarek (1) || Yankee Stadium || 41,033 || 75–46
|-style=background:#bfb
|122||August 17|| Blue Jays || 7–5  (7)  || Green (6–2) || Biagini (1–7) || Robertson (3) || Yankee Stadium || 42,121 || 76–46
|-style=background:#bfb
|123||August 18|| Blue Jays || 11–6 || Severino (16–6) || Reid-Foley (0–2) ||—|| Yankee Stadium || 44,778 || 77–46
|-style=background:#bfb
|124||August 19|| Blue Jays || 10–2 || Happ (14–6) || Borucki (2–3) ||—|| Yankee Stadium || 43,176 || 78–46
|-style=background:#bfb
|125||August 21||@ Marlins || 2–1 (12) || Cole (4–1) || Guerra (1–1) || Kahnle (1) || Marlins Park || 26,275 || 79–46
|-style=background:#fbb
|126||August 22||@ Marlins || 3–9 || García (2–2) || Lynn (8–9) ||—|| Marlins Park || 25,547 || 79–47
|-style=background:#bfb
|127||August 24||@ Orioles|| 7–5 (10) || Green (7–2) || Carroll (0–2) || Britton (5) || Orioles Park at Camden Yards || 27,150 || 80–47
|-style=background:#bfb
|128||August 25||@ Orioles || 10–3 || Happ (15–6) || Yacabonis (0–2) || Cessa (1) || Orioles Park at Camden Yards || 32,445 || 81–47
|-style=background:#bfb
|129||August 25||@ Orioles || 5–1 || Gray (10–8) || Cashner (4–12) || Betances (1) || Orioles Park at Camden Yards || 26,236 || 82–47
|-style=background:#bfb
|130||August 26||@ Orioles || 5–3 || Severino (17–6) || Bundy (7–13) || Robertson (4) || Orioles Park at Camden Yards || 17,343 || 83–47
|-style=background:#fbb
|131||August 27|| White Sox || 2–6 || Rodón (6–3) || Tanaka (9–5) ||—|| Yankee Stadium || 41,456 || 83–48
|-style=background:#bfb
|132||August 28|| White Sox || 5–4 || Betances (3–4) || Covey (4–12) ||—|| Yankee Stadium || 40,015 || 84–48
|-style=background:#fbb
|133||August 29|| White Sox || 1–4 || López (5–9) || Sabathia (7–5) || Fry (4) || Yankee Stadium || 40,887 || 84–49
|-style=background:#fbb
|134||August 30|| Tigers || 7–8 || Wilson (2–4)|| Betances (4–4) || Greene (28) || Yankee Stadium || 37,195 || 84–50
|-style=background:#bfb
|135||August 31|| Tigers || 7–5 || Britton (2–0) || Jiménez (4–4) || Robertson (5) || Yankee Stadium || 41,026 || 85–50
|-

|-style=background:#bfb
|136||September 1|| Tigers || 2–1 || Tanaka (10–5) || Norris (0–3) || Betances (2) || Yankee Stadium || 42,816 || 86–50
|-style=background:#fbb
|137||September 2|| Tigers || 7–11 || Boyd (9–12) || Lynn (8–10) ||—|| Yankee Stadium || 43,721 || 86–51
|-style=background:#fbb
|138||September 3||@ Athletics || 3–6 || Cahill (6–3) || Sabathia (7–6) || Treinen (36) || Oakland–Alameda County Coliseum || 40,546 || 86–52
|-style=background:#bfb
|139||September 4||@ Athletics || 5–1 || Robertson (8–3) || Rodney (4–3) ||—|| Oakland–Alameda County Coliseum || 17,536 || 87–52
|-style=background:#fbb
|140||September 5||@ Athletics || 2–8 || Fiers (11–6) || Severino (17–7) ||—|| Oakland–Alameda County Coliseum || 21,004 || 87–53
|-style=background:#bfb
|141||September 7||@ Mariners || 4–0 || Tanaka (11–5) || Paxton (11–6) ||—|| Safeco Field || 32,195 || 88–53
|-style=background:#bfb
|142||September 8||@ Mariners || 4–2 || Lynn (9–10) || Vincent (3–3) || Betances (3) || Safeco Field || 38,733 || 89–53
|-style=background:#fbb
|143||September 9||@ Mariners || 2–3 || Colomé (6–5) || Betances (4–5) || Díaz (54) || Safeco Field || 34,917 || 89–54 
|-style=background:#bfb
|144||September 10||@ Twins || 7–2 || Happ (16–6) || Gibson (7–13) ||—|| Target Field || 21,565 || 90–54
|-style=background:#fbb
|145||September 11||@ Twins || 5–10 || Stewart (1–1) || Gray (10–9) ||—|| Target Field || 20,343 || 90–55
|-style=background:#fbb
|146||September 12||@ Twins || 1–3 || Odorizzi (6–10) || Severino (17–8) || Hildenberger (6) || Target Field || 24,134 || 90–56
|-style=background:#bfb
|147||September 14|| Blue Jays || 11–0 || Tanaka (12–5) || Estrada (7–12) || Cessa (2) || Yankee Stadium || 40,138 || 91–56
|-style=background:#fbb
|148||September 15|| Blue Jays || 7–8 || Reid-Foley (2–3) || Sabathia (7–7) || Giles (21) || Yankee Stadium || 43,130 || 91–57
|-style=background:#fbb
|149||September 16|| Blue Jays || 2–3 || Pannone (3–1) || Betances (4–6) || Giles (22) || Yankee Stadium || 41,758 || 91–58
|-style=background:#bfb
|150||September 18|| Red Sox || 3–2 || Green (8–2) || Workman (6–1) || Britton (6) || Yankee Stadium || 38,695 || 92–58
|-style=background:#bfb
|151||September 19|| Red Sox || 10–1 || Severino (18–8) || Price (15–7) ||—|| Yankee Stadium || 43,297 || 93–58
|-style=background:#fbb
|152||September 20|| Red Sox || 6–11 || Wright (3–1) || Green (8–3) || — || Yankee Stadium || 47,351 || 93–59
|-style=background:#bfb
|153||September 21|| Orioles || 10–8 || Sabathia (8–7) || Ramírez (1–7) || Betances (4) || Yankee Stadium || 39,903 || 94–59
|-style=background:#bfb
|154||September 22|| Orioles || 3–2 (11) || Kahnle (2–0) || Fry (0–2) || — || Yankee Stadium || 40,185 || 95–59
|-style=background:#fbb
|155||September 23|| Orioles || 3–6 || Meisinger (2–0) || Cole (4–2) || Givens (9) || Yankee Stadium || 43,606 || 95–60
|-style=background:#bfb
|156||September 24||@ Rays || 4–1 || Gray (11–9) || Yarbrough (15–6) || Britton (7) || Tropicana Field || 13,832 || 96–60
|-style=background:#bfb
|157||September 25||@ Rays || 9–2 || Severino (19–8) || Faria (4–4) || — || Tropicana Field || 10,953 || 97–60
|-style=background:#fbb
|158||September 26||@ Rays || 7–8 || Chirinos (5–5) || Tanaka (12–6) || Romo (24) || Tropicana Field || 11,325 || 97–61
|-style=background:#bfb
|159||September 27||@ Rays || 12–1 || Sabathia (9–7) || Schultz (2–2) || — || Tropicana Field || 12,349 || 98–61
|-style=background:#bfb
|160||September 28||@ Red Sox || 11–6 || Happ (17–6) || Johnson (4–5) || — || Fenway Park || 36,779 || 99–61
|-style=background:#bfb
|161||September 29||@ Red Sox || 8–5 || Lynn (10–10) || Rodríguez (12–5) || Chapman (32) || Fenway Park || 36,375 || 100–61
|-style=background:#fbb
|162||September 30||@ Red Sox || 2–10 || Rodriguez (13–5) || Cessa (1–4) ||—|| Fenway Park || 36,201 || 100–62
|-

Postseason

Postseason Game log

|- bgcolor="bbffbb"
|1|| October 3 || Athletics || Yankee Stadium || 7–2 || Betances (1–0) || Hendriks (0–1) || — || 49,620 || 1−0 

|- bgcolor=#fbb
| 1 || October 5 || @ Red Sox || Fenway Park || 4−5 || Sale (1–0) || Happ (0–1) || Kimbrel (1) || 39,059 || 0–1 
|- bgcolor=#bfb
| 2 || October 6 || @ Red Sox || Fenway Park || 6−2 || Tanaka (1–0) || Price (0–1) || — || 39,151 || 1−1 
|- bgcolor=#fbb
| 3 || October 8 || Red Sox || Yankee Stadium || 1−16 || Eovaldi (1–0) || Severino (0–1) || — || 49,657 || 1−2 
|- bgcolor=#fbb
| 4 || October 9 || Red Sox || Yankee Stadium || 3−4 || Porcello (1−0) || Sabathia (0−1) || Kimbrel (2) || 49,641 || 1−3

Postseason rosters

| style="text-align:left" |
Pitchers: 19 Masahiro Tanaka 30 David Robertson 34 J. A. Happ 36 Lance Lynn 40 Luis Severino 53 Zack Britton 54 Aroldis Chapman 56 Jonathan Holder 57 Chad Green 68 Dellin Betances 
Catchers: 24 Gary Sánchez 28 Austin Romine 66 Kyle Higashioka
Infielders: 12 Tyler Wade 14 Neil Walker 18 Didi Gregorius 25 Gleyber Torres 29 Adeiny Hechavarria 41 Miguel Andújar 45 Luke Voit
Outfielders: 11 Brett Gardner 26 Andrew McCutchen 31 Aaron Hicks 99 Aaron Judge 
Designated hitters: 27 Giancarlo Stanton 
|- valign="top"

| style="text-align:left" |
Pitchers: 19 Masahiro Tanaka 30 David Robertson 34 J. A. Happ 36 Lance Lynn 40 Luis Severino 52 CC Sabathia 53 Zack Britton 54 Aroldis Chapman 56 Jonathan Holder 57 Chad Green 68 Dellin Betances 71 Stephen Tarpley 
Catchers: 24 Gary Sánchez 28 Austin Romine
Infielders: 14 Neil Walker 18 Didi Gregorius 25 Gleyber Torres 29 Adeiny Hechavarria 41 Miguel Andújar 45 Luke Voit
Outfielders: 11 Brett Gardner 26 Andrew McCutchen 31 Aaron Hicks 99 Aaron Judge 
Designated hitters: 27 Giancarlo Stanton
|- valign="top"

Farm system

Notes

References

External links
2018 New York Yankees at Baseball Reference
2018 New York Yankees season

New York Yankees seasons
New York Yankees
New York Yankees
2010s in the Bronx